is a Japanese professional footballer who plays as a winger for Liga 1 club PSM Makassar.

Playing career
Kenzo Nambu joined to J3 League club Kataller Toyama in 2015. In 2016, he moved to Briobecca Urayasu.

Club statistics
Updated to 20 February 2018.

References

External links

1992 births
Living people
Chukyo University alumni
Association football people from Tokyo
J3 League players
Japan Football League players
Kenzo Nambu
Liga 1 (Indonesia) players
Kataller Toyama players
Briobecca Urayasu players
FC Osaka players
Kenzo Nambu
Kenzo Nambu
Kenzo Nambu
Kenzo Nambu
PSM Makassar players
Association football defenders
Japanese expatriate footballers
Japanese expatriate sportspeople in Thailand
Japanese expatriate sportspeople in Indonesia
Expatriate footballers in Thailand
Expatriate footballers in Indonesia
Japanese footballers